John Cavendish Lyttelton, 9th Viscount Cobham,  (23 October 1881 – 31 July 1949), was a British peer, soldier, and Conservative politician from the Lyttelton family.

Biography
Cobham was the eldest son of Charles Lyttelton, 8th Viscount Cobham, and the Hon. Mary Susan Caroline Cavendish, daughter of William Cavendish, 2nd Baron Chesham. Alfred Lyttelton was his uncle. He was educated at Eton. Like his father and his uncle, Cobham was a successful cricketer. He represented Worcestershire County Cricket Club in three first-class matches during 1924–5. He was President of Marylebone Cricket Club in 1935, again emulating his father and uncle.

Lyttelton was commissioned a second lieutenant in the Rifle Brigade on 4 December 1901, and served with the regiment in the Second Boer War in South Africa. He returned home with the SS Kinfauns Castle after the war had ended, leaving Cape Town in early August 1902. After a couple of months on leave, during which there were formal celebrations as he attained his majority, he re-joined the regiment in South Africa in late 1902. From 1905 to 1908 he was again back in South Africa as aide-de-camp to the High Commissioner.

Lyttelton was elected to the House of Commons for Droitwich in the January 1910 general election, a seat he held until his resignation 1916 (being appointed Steward and Bailiff of the Manor of Northstead). During the First World War he fought at Gallipoli and in Egypt, the Sinai and Palestine, achieving the rank of lieutenant colonel. He succeeded his father as ninth Viscount Cobham in 1922 and entered the House of Lords. In 1939 he was appointed Under-Secretary of State for War in the government of Neville Chamberlain, a position he retained until May 1940. Apart from his political and military career, he was also Lord Lieutenant of Worcestershire from 1923 to 1949.

Marriage and children

Cobham married Violet, daughter of Charles Leonard, on 30 June 1908.  They had five children together:

 Charles John Lyttelton, 10th Viscount Cobham (8 August 1909 – 20 March 1977)
 Hon Meriel Catherine Lyttelton (1 May 1911 – 11 November 1930)
 Hon Viola Maud Lyttelton (10 June 1912 – 3 May 1987), married Robert Grosvenor, 5th Duke of Westminster
 Hon Audrey Lavinia Lyttelton (3 August 1918 – 3 March 2007)
 Hon Lavinia Mary Yolande Lyttelton (21 August 1921 – 4 July 2007)

Cobham died in July 1949, aged 67, and was succeeded in his titles by his son Charles, who later served as Governor-General of New Zealand. Lord Cobham is buried in the Lyttleton family plot at St John the Baptist Church, Hagley. Lady Cobham died in 1966.

Notes

References

 contains his Wisden obituary from the Wisden Cricketers' Almanack

External links 
 

1881 births
1949 deaths
Rifle Brigade officers
British Army personnel of the Second Boer War
Lyttleton, John
Lyttleton, John
Lord-Lieutenants of Worcestershire
People educated at Eton College
Lyttleton, John
Lyttleton, John
Lyttleton, John
Lyttleton, John
UK MPs who inherited peerages
Lyttleton, John
British Army personnel of World War I
John Lyttelton, 9th Viscount Cobham
War Office personnel in World War II
9
Ministers in the Chamberlain wartime government, 1939–1940